Harlem World was an American hip hop group founded by Mase that was signed to Jermaine Dupri's So So Def. The group consisted of seven members: Mase's sister Baby Stase (Stason Betha), Blinky Blink, Cardan, Huddy (Andre Hudson), Meeno, Suga J, and a then unknown Loon. They released their first and only album, The Movement on March 9, 1999, which would make it to #11 on the Billboard 200 and be certified gold the following month. Despite the success of the album, the group disbanded later in the year with their last appearance being Mase's "From Scratch" on his second album, Double Up.

On October 13, 2010, member Huddy was killed in an early morning traffic accident on the George Washington Bridge in New York City.

Discography

Studio album

Singles

References

Hip hop groups from New York City
So So Def Recordings artists